Euclid Avenue, known after 1953 as Cleveland station, was a former railroad station at the corner of Euclid Avenue and East 55th Street in Cleveland. It was at the border of the Goodrich–Kirtland Park neighborhood to the north and the Central neighborhood to the south. Euclid Avenue station served as the terminus of the Pennsylvania Railroad line to Cleveland in its final years because of the closure and demolition of Cleveland Union Depot. The station was originally at ground level, but the tracks were later elevated over Euclid Avenue.

History 
A station at the intersection of Euclid Street (Euclid Avenue from 1870) and Willson Avenue (East 55th Street from 1906) first opened in 1856, when Jared V. Willson and his wife executed a quitclaim deed for $1, partitioning their plot of land on the SE corner of the intersection for a small wooden shelter to be built by the Cleveland and Pittsburgh Railroad. Additional funds were provided by residents of Euclid Street, contributing $500 towards the construction of said station building. The railroad and station were leased for 99 years by the Pennsylvania Company in 1871.

This train station was a stop on both President Lincoln and President Garfield's funeral trains (April 28, 1865 and September 24, 1881, respectively). The caskets were unloaded and paraded to Public Square. Lincoln was brought from Buffalo to Cleveland Union Depot and proceeded to Euclid. Garfield was brought up from Pittsburgh on the PRR line to Cleveland. Additionally this station served as a stop on Lincoln's inauguration tour on February 15, 1861. A new station building, described by the Plain Dealer as an "elegant little passenger station" was built at this location in August 1873.

The final stationhouse opened for service on June 8, 1902, with the previous structure being demolished shortly afterwards to make room for parking on the west side of the station. The tracks over Euclid Avenue were elevated in the early 1910s, prompting a repurposing of this station. On June 13, 1913, the station was temporarily closed "and then moved about twenty-five feet west and thirty feet south", allowing for the expansion of the station underneath the tracks, the vault of which is still extant today. The expanded station opened on March 3, 1914, implementing the 1902 at-grade stationhouse into the design. Permanent platforms and platform shelters were added once the elevated structure could settle.

This station was made the northern terminal of passenger service after Union Depot closed on September 26, 1953. The Clevelander began making commuter stops on October 23, 1959, and remaining passenger service to Pittsburgh was truncated to Youngstown after April 25, 1964.

Final passenger service between Cleveland and Youngstown station ended on January 29, 1965.

The 1914 vault and platform staircase remain partially intact as of 2015.

Passenger trains

1930
Noted passenger trains in 1930 included:

Pittsburgh Express - Cleveland to Harrisburg eastbound
Red Arrow - Cleveland to New York eastbound
The Manhattan - Cleveland to New York eastbound
Clevelander - New York to Cleveland westbound
Buckeye Limited - Cleveland to New York eastbound

1954
Noted passenger trains in 1954 included:

Clevelander - Cleveland–New York City (truncated to Cleveland–Pittsburgh in 1961, discontinued in 1964)
Morning Steeler & Afternoon Steeler - Cleveland–Pittsburgh (discontinued 1957 and 1958 respectively)

Gallery

Notes

References

External links
 Case Western Reserve University Encyclopedia of Cleveland History - Pennsylvania Railroad
 

1856 establishments in Ohio
Buildings and structures in Cleveland
Railway stations in the United States opened in 1856
Railway stations closed in 1965
Former Pennsylvania Railroad stations
Former railway stations in Ohio